Nicola Jane Chapman, Baroness Chapman (3 August 1961 – 3 September 2009) was a British peer and disability rights activist.

Chapman was born in Leeds, with a congenital disability, Osteogenesis imperfecta (brittle bone disease).  She was expected to survive only a few hours after her birth, but lived into her 40s, by which time she estimated she had at least 600 bone fractures. She reached  in height, and used an electric wheelchair.

She was educated at home, and then at John Jamieson School in Leeds, a school for children with physical disabilities.  She later moved to the mainstream Park Lane College of Higher Education and then studied mathematics and management at Trinity and All Saints College in Horsforth.  She was a volunteer tutor for the Apex Trust, then worked at Leeds City Council and then became a teacher in adult education, before her disability forced her to give up work.  She continued as a volunteer disability activist, campaigning for independent living and access to public buildings.  She was chair of the Leeds Centre for Integrated Living and the Leeds United Disabled Organisation (Ludo).

She was appointed to the House of Lords on 24 June 2004 as Baroness Chapman, of Leeds in the County of West Yorkshire and was the first person with a congenital disability to sit in the House of Lords. Her peerage was conferred on the recommendation of the House of Lords Appointments Commission, sometimes known as the "People's Peers" scheme. She had been nominated for her peerage by the Habinteg Housing Association, an organisation that provides practical support for those with disabilities, which she chaired.

She gave her maiden speech in the debate on the Mental Capacity Bill, critiquing provisions that would allow an appointed person to make medical decisions on behalf of a disabled patient, saying that "If the Bill had been passed 43 years ago, I would not be here."  She later spoke against proposals to assist people with a terminal illness to end their life. She also campaigned for section 36 of the Disability Discrimination Act 1995 to be brought into force, given taxi drivers a duty to transport passengers in wheelchairs.

She had a love of Leeds United Football Club, regularly attended games at Elland Road and was chair of the Leeds United Disabled Supporters Organisation. In 2010 Leeds United renamed the banqueting suite to "The Nicky Chapman Suite".

She died of pneumonia, at Leeds General Infirmary.  Her mother died of cancer in 1989.  She was survived by her father and two brothers.

References

External links
 Announcement of her introduction at the House of Lords House of Lords minutes of proceedings, 8 September 2004
 Baroness Chapman's page on TheyWorkForYou

1961 births
2009 deaths
Deaths from pneumonia in England
Life peeresses created by Elizabeth II
Politicians from Leeds
People's peers
People with osteogenesis imperfecta
British politicians with disabilities
Alumni of Leeds Trinity University
Royalty and nobility with disabilities
20th-century British women politicians